La Salle Hotel or LaSalle Hotel may refer to:

 LaSalle Hotel (Bryan, Texas), Bryan, Texas, USA
 LaSalle Hotel (South Bend, Indiana), South Bend, Indiana, USA
 La Salle Hotel, Chicago, Illinois, USA